Two ships of the Royal Navy have borne the name HMS Chiddingfold after the fox hunt at Petworth, Sussex:

  was a  escort destroyer launched in 1941. She was transferred to the Indian Navy after the Second World War and renamed INS Ganga (D94).
  is a  launched in 1983 and currently in service.

References

Royal Navy ship names